The Van Nuys Apartments is an apartment building in Los Angeles, California, United States.

History
The apartments were developed by their namesake – Isaac Newton Van Nuys – in 1913 as a financial center in the heart of Los Angeles. The building was designed by the architecture firm Morgan, Walls & Clements, who designed other notable landmarks such as the Mayan Theater, El Capitan Theater, and The Citadel. The  building features an 11-story steel frame with masonry-clad walls;  its primary facades facing Spring street and 7th street.

Upon its opening, First National Bank occupied the entire first floor and basement of the building, while Dean Witter & Company, Merrill Lynch, and other financial services firms occupied offices in the upper floors. The building served as a bank and office building until the late 1970s.

In 1982 the building was converted into a 299-unit residential complex reserved for low-income senior citizens via funds from the HUD and CRA/LA. The basement was converted into parking.

The L.A. Conservancy has deemed the Van Nuys Apartments building a historic landmark.

The Van Nuys Apartments
Recently the Van Nuys Apartments underwent a $47.97 million renovation. The renovation focused on restoration of the historic elements (primarily on the exterior of the building), remodeling of the units’ interiors, and repair of the building’s rooftop. Approximately $50,000 of hard cost per unit was spent on remodeling the interiors of each of the 134 studios, 155 one-bedroom, and 10 two-bedroom apartments.

The Van Nuys apartment community is a HUD subsidized, project-based Section 8 property; catering to seniors over 62 years of age and individuals with disabilities. The property features on-site security 24 hours per day and a recreation room.

Commercial Tenants
In addition to the 299 residential units, the building also features 5 commercial spaces. Versalles Beauty Salon and Super Collection clothing are 2 of the current tenants.

External links
AIMCO
AIMCO Apartments
HUD

References

Apartment buildings in Los Angeles
Buildings and structures in Downtown Los Angeles
Residential buildings completed in 1913
1913 establishments in California
1910s architecture in the United States
Morgan, Walls & Clements buildings